Ducey's Bass Lake Lodge is a historic mountain lodge located in Bass Lake, Madera County, California.

History 

In 1941, Buddy Freeman constructed Freeman's Bass Lake Lodge on the north shore of Bass Lake, California about one mile west of the Pines Village. The lodge consisted of a bar, restaurant, and rental cabins.

Freeman sold the lodge in 1947 to Jeff Jeffords, Karl Briz and A.C. Zingle who later sold to Maurice and Marie Ducey in 1950. Under the Ducey's management a general store and campgrounds were built and the lodge's collection of Native American artifacts, guns, antiques, and taxidermy expanded substantially.  The Ducey's also changed the name of the lodge to Ducey's Bass Lake Lodge. Upon their retirement in 1968, the lodge was sold to Al Westman, who sold it a year later to Dr. Robert and Gloria Rickard, before it finally became part of the Pines Resort in 1975.

Ducey's was featured as Wally and Juanita’s Perk’s Pine Lodge in the film The Great Outdoors, shot on location in Bass Lake in October 1987. The set of the vacation cabin, built on the backlot at Universal Studios, was designed to match the style of Ducey’s existing cabins.

On June 2, 1988 the lodge was destroyed as the result of a kitchen fire. The building's many attics and additions made fighting the fire difficult and four hours later the only things that remained were the slate porch and stone chimneys.

Ducey's on the Lake
The Pines Resort immediately began plans to rebuild the lodge. Local architect Michael Karby (AIA/MCRP) was hired to design a new lodge that would sit along the lakeshore one mile east of the original Ducey's.

The new lodge opened on Saturday, April 20, 1991. The event was marked by a ceremonial dance by members of the Western Mono tribe.

A special effort was made to rebuild the lodge's collection of artifacts lost in the 1988 fire. The original 12' Ducey's road sign (spared by the fire) hangs in the lobby alongside donated hunting trophies and local resort photos from throughout the 20th century.

References

External links
The Pines Resort owns and operates Ducey's on the Lake.
Ducey's on the Lake was designed by architect Michael Karby AIA/MCRP

Hotels in California
Hotels established in 1941
Buildings and structures in Madera County, California
Tourist attractions in Madera County, California